Vijayaraghavan (born 12 January 1951) is an Indian actor who predominantly works in Malayalam cinema. He is known for his character roles. He is the son of drama and cinema artist N. N. Pillai.

Early life and family

Vijayaraghavan is the son of veteran actor N. N. Pillai and Chinnamma. He was born in Kuala Lumpur on 12 January 1951, the capital of the Federation of Malaya, where his father worked as an Estate Manager. He has two sisters Sulochana and Renuka. He had his primary education from Govt. High School, Kudamaloor.

Acting career

Vijayaraghavan made his film debut with Kaapaalika, which was based on his father's play of the same name. He appeared in just a couple of scenes in this film. His opening as a full-fledged actor occurred ten years later in Surumayitta Kannukal (1983). However, it was only after he appeared in the 1987 film New Delhi that Vijayaraghavan became a busy star in Malayalam film.

He got a break with his performance in the 1989 film Ramji Rao Speaking, in which he played the title role of the villain Ramji Rao. In the mid-1990s Vijayaraghavan played the hero in a number of low-budget Malayalam movies. He appeared in a few movies as second hero with Suresh Gopi in the lead role, including Commissioner. He also played notable roles in movies such as Ekalavyan, Crime File, Mafia and King. In 1995, he reprised his role as the character Ramji Rao in Mannar Mathai Speaking.

In the 2000s, he turned to character and villain roles and appeared in various movies, among them C.I.D. Moosa,  Lion, Chotta Mumbai, Mayavi, Bharathchandran I.P.S. and Raavanaprabhu. He has also appeared in a popular Malayalam television serial entitled Kavyanjali, produced by Balaji Telefilms.

Vijayaraghavan is specially known for playing the iconic character Ramji Rao in 1989 film Ramji Rao Speaking, in 1995 film Mannar Mathai Speaking, in 2014 film Mannar Mathai Speaking 2 and in 2019 film Mask.

Personal life

He is married to Anitha and has 2 sons. The elder son, Jinadevan is a businessman and is married to Rakhi. The younger son, Devadevan is in film industry. He is settled at Olassa, Kottayam District, Kerala.

Filmography

Malayalam films

1970s

1980s

1990s

2000s

2010s

2020s

Tamil films

Television
Crime Branch (Kairali TV)
Kaavyanjali (Surya TV)
Snehatheeram (Surya TV)

References

External links
 Vijayaraghavan at MSI
 

21st-century Indian male actors
Male actors from Kerala
Living people
Male actors in Malayalam cinema
Indian male film actors
20th-century Indian male actors
1951 births
People from Kuala Lumpur